The 2018 Coastal Carolina Chanticleers football team represented Coastal Carolina University during the 2018 NCAA Division I FBS football season. The Chanticleers were led by sixth-year head coach Joe Moglia and played their home games at Brooks Stadium. They competed as a member of the East Division of the Sun Belt Conference. They finished the season 5–7, 2–6 in Sun Belt play to finish in fourth place in the East Division.

Previous season
They finished the 2017 season 3–9, 2–6 in Sun Belt play to finish in a tie for 10th place. The season marked the Chanticleers' first year in the Sun Belt and the FBS, and their second of a two-year transition period. They would not become bowl-eligible until the 2018 season. Offensive coordinator Jamey Chadwell served as the interim head coach of the Chanticleers this season due to Joe Moglia taking a medical leave.

Preseason

Award watch lists
Listed in the order that they were released

Sun Belt coaches poll
On July 19, 2018, the Sun Belt released their preseason coaches poll with the Chanticleers predicted to finish in last place of the East Division.

Preseason All-Sun Belt Teams
The Chanticleers had one player selected to the preseason all-Sun Belt teams.

Defense

2nd team

Silas Kelly – LB

Schedule

Game summaries

at South Carolina

UAB

at Campbell

at Louisiana

at Troy

Louisiana–Monroe

at UMass

at Georgia State

Appalachian State

Arkansas State

Georgia Southern

at South Alabama

References

Coastal Carolina
Coastal Carolina Chanticleers football seasons
Coastal Carolina Chanticleers football